Riddick Bowe vs. Andrew Golota, billed as "Big Daddy's Home", was a professional boxing match contested on July 11, 1996. The fight was held at Madison Square Garden in New York City and was televised as part of an HBO World Championship Boxing card.

Bowe won the fight by disqualification in the seventh round after Golota did not adhere to several warnings and point deductions for punching Bowe in testes. A melee erupted in the ring following the decision, which led to several arrests.

Background
Bowe was looking to get himself back into the mix for the world heavyweight championship as 1996 began. Since losing his World Boxing Association and International Boxing Federation championships back to Evander Holyfield in their second fight, Bowe had gone through five comeback fights and won four of them, with a no-contest against Buster Mathis, Jr. He also managed to defeat Herbie Hide for the then-fringe World Boxing Organization heavyweight championship, made one defense of the title, then vacated it to pursue a third fight with Holyfield in November 1995, which he won by technical knockout in the eighth round.

The heavyweight championship picture, meanwhile, was significantly muddled at the time. In fact, for the first time since Mike Tyson began his quest to become the undisputed champion, all of the major sanctioning bodies recognized different fighters as champions. Tyson won the World Boxing Council’s champion in March 1996. Entering 1996, Bruce Seldon was recognized by the World Boxing Association as its champion, and the International Boxing Federation’s championship was held by Michael Moorer. The recognized lineal champion was George Foreman, who had been forced to vacate the WBA and IBF titles he won from Moorer in their 1994 title fight.

Meanwhile, a former rival of Bowe's was also looking to get himself back into title contention. Lennox Lewis had been awarded the WBC championship when Bowe vacated it rather than fight him due to lingering bad blood between the two. Lewis was defeated for the title in 1994 by Oliver McCall via a controversial knockout; McCall, in turn, was defeated by Frank Bruno, Lewis’ fellow countryman, in the interim. Tyson's promoter at the time, Don King, had promoted the McCall-Bruno fight (since he was also McCall's promoter) and negotiated for the winner to make their next fight against Tyson, who knocked Bruno out to take the title.

Tyson was contractually obligated to defend against Lewis, but he and King wanted to pursue a unification contest with WBA champion Seldon instead. In May 1996, Lewis and Tyson's camp agreed to a settlement which freed Tyson to seek the contest with Seldon. Lewis and Bowe, meanwhile, came to terms on a deal to fight later on in the fall of 1996.

In the interim, Lewis and Bowe each agreed to take tuneup fights that would be carried by HBO. Lewis signed to fight Ray Mercer, a former top contender who had been mostly inactive in the previous two years and had lost his most recent fight. Bowe elected to take on undefeated Polish heavyweight Andrew Golota, the 1988 bronze medalist who had won most of his fights by knockout but who had yet to fight a big name contender in his career. Golota was also infamous in boxing circles for his frequent fouls during matches, including an incident where he bit Samson Po’uha in the neck.

Prior to the match, the confident Bowe declared himself "The People's Champion" and paid little attention to Golota, instead looking ahead to his long-awaited bout with Lewis and a potential superfight with Tyson. Though Bowe entered the fight at a career high 252 pounds, 12 pounds heavier than what he weighed in his previous match with Holyfield, he nevertheless was made a 12–1 favorite. When explaining his weight gain, Bowe made it clear that he had not trained much for Golota, infamously asking "How do you train for a bum?" Golota's trainer Lou Duva remained confident that his fighter could defeat Bowe, saying of Bowe's weight gain: "He's everything I want him to be.”

The Fight
In the opening round, Golota took advantage of Bowe being overweight and came out firing. Golota was able to land his jab at a constant rate and landed nearly half of his 69 punches in the first round while Bowe was only able to land 17. The two men would have a close round 2 with both men landing powerful shots on one another, but Golota regained control in round 3 and pushed the action further in round 4. Bowe was looking overmatched and an upset was becoming more and more likely for the Polish contender as the fight progressed. Bowe did not have an answer for Golota and was clearly out of shape and struggling as the fight advanced into the middle rounds.

However, Golota's fouling tendencies caused an issue. He landed shots to Bowe's testes in the second and third rounds, garnering warnings from referee Wayne Kelly. Then, in the fourth, Golota hit Bowe in the testes so hard that he dropped to the canvas. Kelly penalized Golota by taking away a point, then put Bowe on a five-minute clock to try to recover. He did after three minutes, and shortly thereafter the bell rang to end the round.

The seventh round began with Golota continuing to press the former champion, but once again he was unable to keep his punches up and landed a fourth blow to the testes during the course of the round. Kelly warned Golota that he would be disqualified if he did it again. The round continued, but with forty seconds left, Golota landed a fifth shot to the testes, dropping Bowe again. Kelly immediately disqualified Golota, handing victory to Bowe.

Post-fight riot
Immediately after the fight was stopped, members of Bowe's security team entered the ring and approached Golota, who had his back turned as he was going back to his corner. One of the men pushed Golota from behind which caused Golota to respond by throwing punches at the man. Another man, later identified as Jason Harris, began hitting Golota in the head with a walkie-talkie, opening up a cut that required 11 stitches to close. Golota's trainer, 74-year-old Lou Duva, was also injured in the melee and collapsed to the canvas after experiencing chest pains and ultimately had to be taken from the ring on a stretcher. Eventually Golota's fans entered the brawl and would continue to trade punches with Bowe's entourage and fans inside the ring as well as outside of it. HBO announcer Jim Lampley went up a couple levels of Madison Square Garden because the announcers' table was destroyed in the riot, while fellow announcers Larry Merchant and George Foreman stayed at ringside. Foreman even tried to stop the riot in the ring himself by saving Lampley and Merchant from fans attacking them. Foreman was also telling fans at the start of the riot not to get in the ring and attack anyone. In the end, 10 arrests were made, eight policemen were injured and nine spectators had to be hospitalized.

Aftermath

Bowe's potential match with Lennox Lewis was scuttled after this fight due to his poor performance. Since there was interest in another fight with Golota, Bowe and his team decided to go in that direction instead. In October 1996, three months after their first match, it was announced that Bowe and Golota would meet again in a rematch that would take place on December 14 in Atlantic City, New Jersey. Bowe admitted that Golota had humiliated him in their previous fight and vowed to be ready for their rematch. Golota took control of the second match and was ahead on all scorecards before once again repeatedly punching Bowe in the testes, leading to another disqualification loss. After his second consecutive poor performance, Riddick Bowe would announce his retirement from boxing at the age of 29. Adding insult to injury, Lewis would seek out Golota for a fight to defend the WBC championship he had regained, which is what Bowe was looking for; Golota suffered a knockout in the first round.

References

External links
 

Golota 1
1996 in boxing
1996 in sports in New York City
1990s in Manhattan
Boxing matches at Madison Square Garden
July 1996 sports events in the United States
Boxing on HBO